Jeffrey "Jeff" Thorpe (born 17 November 1972, in Cockermouth, Cumbria) is an English retired professional footballer who played as a midfielder.

He spent his entire career at Carlisle United before retiring in 2000 due to injury.

He played in the Championship winning 1994-95 season, scoring 4 goals, and made a substitute appearance at Wembley Stadium against Birmingham City in the Auto Windscreen Shield in April 1995 in front of a capacity 76000 fans. 

Persistent back injuries bought a premature end to his career aged just 27 after 11 years with Carlisle. Jeff spent several years as Radio Cumbria match day summariser on Utd games. He lectured in Sport Performance at the University of Cumbria for 11 years and still resides in the county where he also runs a coaching and fitness business.

References

External links

1972 births
Living people
People from Cockermouth
Association football midfielders
English footballers
Carlisle United F.C. players
English Football League players
Doncaster Rovers F.C. players
Footballers from Cumbria